Hallmark Cards, Inc. is a private, family-owned American company based in Kansas City, Missouri. Founded in 1910 by Joyce Hall, Hallmark is the oldest and largest manufacturer of greeting cards in the United States. In 1985, the company was awarded the National Medal of Arts.

In addition to greeting cards, Hallmark also manufactures such products as party goods, gift wrap, and stationery. Hallmark acquired Binney & Smith in 1987, and would later change its name to Crayola, LLC after its well-known Crayola brand of crayons, markers and colored pencils. The company is also involved in television, having produced the long-running Hallmark Hall of Fame series since 1951, and launching the Hallmark Channel 50 years later (replacing an earlier joint venture with The Jim Henson Company, Odyssey Network).

History

Driven by an early 20th-century postcard craze, Joyce Clyde Hall and his older brothers, William and Rollie, began the Norfolk Post Card Company in 1907, initially headquartered in the Norfolk, Nebraska bookstore at which they worked.  The next year, Rollie bought out the store's non-family  business partner and it became "Hall Brothers", doing business as the Hall Book Store. The postcard business soon outgrew the store's resources, and Joyce moved it to Kansas City in 1910. By 1912, the postcard craze had faded and the company had begun selling "Christmas letters" and greeting cards, shortening its name a few years later to the Norfolk Card Company.

In 1917, Hall and his brother Rollie "invented" modern wrapping paper when they ran out of traditional colored tissue paper at the stationery store and substituted fancy French envelope lining paper. After selling the lining paper again the next year, the Hall Brothers started printing their own specifically designed wrapping paper. In 1922, the company expanded throughout the country. The staff grew from 4 to 120 people, and the line increased from holiday cards to include everyday greeting cards.

In 1928, the company introduced the brand name Hallmark, after the hallmark symbol used by goldsmiths in London in the 14th century, and began printing the name on the back of every card. That same year, the company became the first in the greeting card industry to advertise their product nationally. Their first advertisement appeared in Ladies' Home Journal and was written by J.C. Hall himself. In 1931, the Canadian William E. Coutts Company, Ltd., a major card maker, became an affiliate of Hall Brothers – their first international business venture.

In 1944, it adopted its current slogan, "When you care enough to send the very best." It was created by C. E. Goodman, a Hallmark marketing and sales executive, and written on a 3x5 card. The card is on display at the company headquarters. In 1951, Hall sponsored a television program for NBC that gave rise to the Hallmark Hall of Fame, which has won 80 Emmy Awards. Hallmark now has its own cable television channel, the Hallmark Channel which was established in 2001. For a period of about 15 years, Hallmark owned a stake in the Spanish language network Univision.

In 1954, the company name was changed from Hall Brothers to Hallmark. In 1958, William E. Coutts Company, Ltd. was acquired by Hallmark. Until the 1990s, Hallmark's Canadian branch was known as Coutts Hallmark.

In 1973, Hallmark Cards started manufacturing Christmas ornaments. The first collection included 18 ornaments, including six glass ball ornaments. The Hallmark Keepsake Ornament collection is dated and available for just one year. By 1998, 11 million American households collected Hallmark ornaments, and 250,000 people were members of the Keepsake Ornament Collector's Club. The Collector's Club was launched nationally on June 1, 1987. One noted Christmas ornament authority was Clara Johnson Scroggins who wrote extensively about Keepsake Ornaments and had one of the largest private collections of Christmas ornaments.

In 1980, Hallmark Cards acquired Valentine & Sons of Dundee, Scotland, one of the world's oldest publishers of picture postcards.

In 1998, Hallmark made a number of acquisitions, including Britain-based Creative Publishing (a recent spinoff of Fine Art Developments), and U.S.-based InterArt.

As of 2014, The Paper Store LLC is one of the largest independently owned groups of Hallmark Gold Crown stores in the United States. This partnership began in the year 1972.

Employees
Worldwide, Hallmark has over 27,000 employees; 20,000 of them work in the United States, about 5,600 of whom are full-time employees. About 2,700 Hallmarkers work at the Kansas City headquarters.

Management
On June 26, 2019, it was announced that Mike Perry would serve as president and CEO, while Donald J. Hall Jr. serves as executive chairman and David E. Hall as executive vice-chairman.

Creative resources
Hallmark's creative staff consists of around 900 artists, designers, stylists, writers, editors, and photographers. Together, they generate more than 19,000 new and redesigned greeting cards and related products per year. The company offers more than 48,000 products in its model line at any one time.

Products and services
Hallmark offers or has offered the following products and services:

Greeting cards

Hallmark Cards feature several brands and licenses. Shoebox, the company's line of humorous cards, evolved from studio cards. Maxine (by John Wagner), was introduced in 1986 when she appeared on several Shoebox cards the year the alternative card line was launched. hoops&yoyo, were characters created by Bob Holt and Mike Adair. Revilo is another popular line, by artist Oliver Christianson ("Revilo" is "Oliver" spelled backwards). Forever Friends was purchased in 1994 from English entrepreneur Andrew Brownsword, who for four years subsequently was Chief Executive of Hallmark Europe. Image Craft was acquired by the William E. Coutts Company subsidiary of Hallmark Canada in the mid-2000s.

Hallmark has provided software for creating and printing cards. This software has been known as Hallmark Card Studio, with partner Nova Development, and Microsoft Greetings Workshop in partner with Microsoft.

Gift products

Licensors

Some of the licensors for Hallmark's greeting cards, ornaments, and gift products include:

Hallmark Visitors Center
The Hallmark Visitors Center is located at the company's headquarters in Kansas City, Missouri.  The Center features exhibits about the company's history including historic greeting cards and postcards, Christmas ornaments, exhibits from the company's art collection, and displays about the Hallmark Hall of Fame programs and awards. There is also a movie about the company's history.

Hallmark School Store
Alvirne High School in Hudson, New Hampshire, operates the only Hallmark school store in the United States. Besides normal food and beverage items, the "Bronco Barn" store also sells Hallmark cards.  The store is run by students in Marketing I and Marketing II classes, and is open to students all day and after school.

Subsidiaries and assets

Hallmark owns:

In addition, Hallmark Cards is the property manager of the Crown Center commercial complex, adjacent to its headquarters, and the owner of lithographer Litho-Krome Co.

Photographic Collection
In 2006, Hallmark donated its Hallmark Photographic Collection, an extensive collection of photographs by prominent photographers including Todd Webb, to the Nelson-Atkins Museum of Art in Kansas City.

Hallmark Music
In the Philippines, singer Richard Tan sang a song about Hallmark Cards, entitled "No One Throws Away Memories". The song was featured in a commercial of the product in the 1970s.

In the mid-1980s, the company started its music division, issuing compilation albums by a number of popular artists. In 2004, Hallmark entered into a licensing agreement with Somerset Entertainment to produce Hallmark Music CDs.

Former subsidiaries
 Hallmark Entertainment: a producer of television shows and mini-series. Robert Halmi acquired the company in 2006 and it was absorbed into RHI Entertainment;
 Univision: Hallmark owned the Spanish-language broadcaster from 1986 to 1992.

Copyright lawsuits
Neil Armstrong sued Hallmark Cards in 1994 after they used his name and a recording of his quote, "That's one small step for a man, one giant leap for mankind" in a Christmas ornament without permission. The lawsuit was settled out of court for an undisclosed amount of money which Armstrong donated to Purdue University. The case caused Armstrong and NASA to be more careful about the use of astronaut names, photographs and recordings, and to whom he had granted permission. For non-profit and government public-service announcements, he would usually give permission.

On September 6, 2007, Paris Hilton filed an injunction lawsuit against Hallmark Cards Inc., titled Hilton v. Hallmark Cards, in U.S. District Court over the unlawful use of her picture and catchphrase "That's hot" on a greeting card. The card is titled "Paris's First Day as a Waitress" with a photograph of Hilton's face on a cartoon of a waitress serving a plate of food, with a Hilton's dialogue bubble, "Don't touch that, it's hot." (which had a registered trademark on February 13, 2007). Hilton's attorney Brent Blakely said that the infringement damages would be based on profits from the $2.49 greeting cards. A Hallmark spokesperson said that the card was intended as parody, protected under fair use law. The Court of Appeals for the Ninth Circuit reviewed the case and "denied Hallmark's motion to dismiss". Hilton and Hallmark Cards Inc. later settled out of court.

Foreign branches

See also
 Cardmaking
 Hallmark holiday
 Rainbow Brite

References

External links

 
 Corporate website
 Hallmark Baby website 

 
Greeting cards
Companies based in Kansas City, Missouri
American companies established in 1910
Publishing companies established in 1910
1910 establishments in Kansas
Privately held companies based in Missouri
United States National Medal of Arts recipients
Family-owned companies of the United States